Antonio Fabián Silio Alaguire (born 9 May 1966) is a retired long-distance runner from Argentina. He competed in three editions of the World Championships in Athletics (1991 to 1995), racing in the 10,000 metres. His best result was 8th in 1993. He also finished in the top six of three World Half Marathon Championships (1992, 1993, 1998), finishing second in the inaugural World Half Marathon Championships in 1992.

He won the bronze medal in the men's 5000 metres at the 1991 Pan American Games in Havana, Cuba. He finished second in the 10000 metres at the 1994 World Cup, held at Crystal Palace, London, and won the 1995 edition of the Hamburg Marathon, clocking 2:09:57. 

Prior to his career in track and road running, he competed in cross country and won medals at the South American Cross Country Championships. He won a silver in 1987, the gold in 1988 and a bronze in 1989.

Personal bests

International competitions

References

External links
 
 Official website



1966 births
Living people
Argentine male long-distance runners
Argentine male marathon runners
Olympic athletes of Argentina
Athletes (track and field) at the 1992 Summer Olympics
Athletes (track and field) at the 1996 Summer Olympics
Pan American Games bronze medalists for Argentina
Pan American Games medalists in athletics (track and field)
Athletes (track and field) at the 1987 Pan American Games
Athletes (track and field) at the 1991 Pan American Games
Athletes (track and field) at the 1995 Pan American Games
Athletes (track and field) at the 1999 Pan American Games
World Athletics Championships athletes for Argentina
South American Games bronze medalists for Argentina
South American Games medalists in athletics
Competitors at the 1986 South American Games
Medalists at the 1991 Pan American Games
Olympic male marathon runners
Sportspeople from Entre Ríos Province